José Luis Quiñonez Quiñonez (born May 29, 1984) is an Ecuadorian footballer. He currently plays as a midfielder for Emelec in the Ecuadorian Football League.

Playing style
Quiñonez was given the nickname El Pulpo (The Octopus) by Emelec's fans because of his intelligence on the field, speed, great marking skills and long legs. He is an overall good player that sometimes is also used as a center back and has also scored some goals both from distant shots and headers.

References

1984 births
Living people
Sportspeople from Guayaquil
Ecuadorian footballers
Association football midfielders
Ecuadorian Serie A players
C.S. Emelec footballers
L.D.U. Portoviejo footballers